St. Stephen's High School is an Episcopalian school, located in the Binondo district of Manila. It is considered the first Christian Chinese school established in Luzon. The school offers courses of study from Pre-Kinder to Grade 12.

History
Originally known as St. Stephen's Girls' School, it was founded on July 22, 1917 by St. Stephen's Mission composed of the rector and the Chinese members of the church. Intended for girls, it was known as Seng Kong Hoe in the Chinese community and had 19 enrollees. The first class was held at a church property along Reina Regente Street.

In 1921, the school adopted the lavender and white colors its uniform. By 1925, the Elementary Department was established. Through the efforts of Bishop Mosher, Rev. Hobart Studley and S.C. Choy, a property in Calle Magdalena (now Masangkay Street) was bought in 1928. In 1939, the school moved to Calle Magdalena from its original location.

A mission home and a 15-room building were constructed, with a renovated row of dormitory units. In 1941, the school put up a benefit program at the Rizal Stadium to raise more funds to help cover the cost of new construction. A new building on the La Torre side was completed in December 1941 which housed a library, dormitory and new classrooms.

But on December 8, 1941, the school operations had to stop during the Japanese occupation in the Philippines. The Japanese military sealed off the school compound and the mission house was turned over to a Japanese doctor-director of St. Luke's Hospital. The occupants were forced to move out and the rooms were used for Japanese civilian patients.

American and British school staff became prisoners of war and were confined at the University of Santo Tomas. The new building, which was not yet used was demolished and its new materials and equipment taken. Chinese guerrilla units later took the mission house and used it as headquarters during the liberation from Japanese occupation.

The school reopened in December 1945 after the war under the direction of Huang Ong Bi Gim. St. Stephen's Girls' School offered its service to those unschooled for five years as contribution to the community and nation-building. Nancy L. Yao became the principal in 1946 and Constance Bolderston was the directress.

Rebuilding followed and it was officially renamed St. Stephen's High School. In 1963, a new five-storey high school building was completed. By 1969, an additional building with three storeys was built for elementary students. The old Mosher Hall building on the high school campus was demolished in 1980. A five-storey annex building replaced it and was completed in 1982.

Old elementary school buildings were replaced by two new buildings, which were constructed in 1991 and 1994.

Accreditation
St. Stephen's is recognized by the Philippine Government as a Chinese Filipino school offering English, Filipino and Chinese subjects in the Preschool, Elementary and High School Departments. It is an accredited school of Association of Christian Schools, Colleges and Universities (ACSCU-AAI).

Student life
Aside from the classrooms, the school has modern facilities like the Auditorium, Stephenian Hall (a multi-purpose hall), Nancy L. Yao Library, Electronic Research Center, Speech Laboratory, Wai Ling Tan Audio-Visual Center, Guidance and Counseling Center, Science Laboratories, Journalism Room, Typing Room, Home Economics Room, Clinic, Scout Center, four Computer Laboratories, Music Room, Practical Arts Room, the CSG Gymnasium, Indoor and Outdoor Playground, and the Jimmy Go Swimming Pool.

The school has varsity teams in swimming, track and field, volleyball, table tennis and basketball. It hosted the 37th Season of the Women's National Collegiate Athletic Association (WNCAA) with the theme "Victory Beyond Competition."

St. Stephen's is a venue for inter-school activities and competitions. The Stephenian Math Society hosts the Lord of the Math Inter-school Competition annually at the Stephenian Hall which began in 2005. The school has served as host for training sessions held by the Mathematics Trainers' Guild (MTG) for several years.

The school celebrated its historic 90th founding anniversary on July 22, 2007 with the theme "God's Glory with Exceeding Joy!" In celebration, St. Stephen's held its first Inter-school Extemporaneous Speech Competition, its first Earth Science Quiz, and three concerts: one in cooperation with the Biblical Seminary of the Philippines titled "An Evening of Praise," featuring the Heavenly Melody Singers from Taiwan; a Thanksgiving concert titled "Images of Christ" in November 2007, directed by New York-based conductor Celia Yu Ong and famed director Chinggoy Alonso; and the Thanksgiving marimba concert, featuring alumnus Johnny Yu, Prof. Raul Sunico of the UST Conservatory of Music.

Gallery

References 

High schools in Manila
Chinese-language schools in Manila
Education in Tondo, Manila
Educational institutions established in 1917
Episcopal schools in the Philippines
1917 establishments in the Philippines